Austin O'Malley is a Gaelic footballer who plays for St Patrick's and the Wicklow county team. O'Malley won the Dublin Senior Football Championship with UCD in 2006. The Louisburgh native was involved in a  transfer process which brought him to Dublin club St Vincent's. The story was leaked to Dublin newspaper, the Metro. Austin works as a teacher in St Benildus College, where he uses the strength and ambition that he gained from years on the training pitch to discipline and motivate the pupils. In 2011 he joined Wicklow town club St Patrick's and the Wicklow county team. In 2014 he transferred back to his native club Louisburgh in Co Mayo.

Honours
 Connacht Senior Football Championship (3): 2004, 2006, 2009
 Mayo Intermediate Football Championship (1): 2003
 Mayo Junior Football Championship (1): 2016
 Connacht Junior Club Football Championship (1): 2016
 Dublin Senior Football Championship (1): 2006
 Wicklow Senior Football Championship (1): 2012
 National Football League Division 4 (1): 2012
 Sigerson Cup (1): 2004

References

Year of birth missing (living people)
Living people
Irish schoolteachers
Louisburgh Gaelic footballers
Mayo inter-county Gaelic footballers
St Patrick's (Wicklow) Gaelic footballers
St Vincents (Dublin) Gaelic footballers
UCD Gaelic footballers
Wicklow inter-county Gaelic footballers